Yoon Hyun-ji (born 14 February 1994) is a South Korean judoka. In 2021, she competed in the women's 78 kg event at the 2020 Summer Olympics in Tokyo, Japan.

She is the gold medallist of the 2021 Asian-Pacific Judo Championships in the -78 kg category.

In 2022, she won the gold medal in her event at the Judo Grand Prix Almada held in Almada, Portugal.

References

External links
 
 

1994 births
Living people
South Korean female judoka
Judoka at the 2020 Summer Olympics
Olympic judoka of South Korea
21st-century South Korean women